Sibay Airport  is an airport in Russia located 5 km east of Sibay. It has a simple utilitarian layout.

History 

Airport started in 1955 with rapid development of the city. It services a mining town (the open pit mine is in this town). New asphalt runway built in 1994. At the time, regular service interrupted.

From November 2009 it is planned to restore scheduled airline service to Ufa.

References 

Airports built in the Soviet Union
Airports in Bashkortostan